List of Zorro episodes may refer to:

List of Zorro episodes (1957 TV series), episodes of American (Walt Disney Productions) Zorro TV series 1957–59 and specials 1960–61
List of Zorro episodes (1990 TV series), episodes of American (Family Channel) Zorro TV series 1990–93
List of Zorro: La Espada y la Rosa episodes, episodes of 2007 Spanish-language telenovela

See also
Zorro (1957 TV series)
Zorro (1990 TV series)
El Zorro, la espada y la rosa, 2007 Telemundo telenovela